Michael Barrett (184126 May 1868) was an Irish activist. He was a member of the Fenians.

Barrett was the last man to be publicly hanged in England, for his part in the Clerkenwell explosion in December 1867. The bombing killed 12 bystanders and severely injured many more. Barrett was arrested with several others in a wide ranging sweep of sympathisers with the Irish Republican cause and was the only one found guilty.

Background
Barrett was born in Drumnagreshial in the Ederney area of County Fermanagh. As a young man and in search of work, he moved to Glasgow where he joined the Irish Republican Brotherhood or the Fenians. At the age of 27 he joined the Fenians, which, in the 1860s, was a political movement that dominated Irish Republican politics and defied the Catholic Church, middle-class nationalists who advocated milder approaches and Irish Unionists. Tens of thousands of Irishmen in both Ireland and Great Britain were recruited into its ranks.

Clerkenwell explosion

The Clerkenwell bombing was the most infamous action carried out by the Fenians in mainland Britain. It resulted in a long-lived backlash that fomented much hostility against the Irish community in Britain.

The events that led up to the bombing started with the arrest, in November 1867, of Ricard O'Sullivan Burke, a senior Fenian arms agent who planned the "prison-van escape" in Manchester a few months earlier. O'Sullivan-Burke was subsequently imprisoned on remand in the Middlesex House of Detention, Clerkenwell. On 13 December an attempt to rescue him was made by blowing a hole in the prison wall. The explosion was seriously misjudged; it demolished not only a large section of the wall, but also a number of tenement houses opposite in Corporation Lane (now Corporation Row), killing 12 people and wounding up to 120 more.

The bombing had a traumatic effect on British working-class opinion. Karl Marx, then living in London, observed:

The Radical, Charles Bradlaugh, condemned the incident in his newspaper The National Reformer as an act "calculated to destroy all sympathy, and to evoke the opposition of all classes".

The day before the explosion, the Prime Minister, Benjamin Disraeli, had banned all political demonstrations in London in an attempt to put a stop to the weekly meetings and marches that were being held in support of the Fenians. He had feared that the ban might be challenged, but the explosion had the effect of turning public opinion in his favour.

Arrest and trial
Months earlier, Barrett had been arrested in Glasgow for illegally discharging a firearm and allegedly false evidence was used to implicate him in the Clerkenwell Prison explosion.

In court, he produced witnesses who testified that he had been in Scotland on the date of the incident. The main case against him rested on the evidence of Patrick Mullany (a Dubliner known to have given false testimony before and whose price was a free passage to Australia), who told the court that Barrett had informed him that he had carried out the explosion with an accomplice by the name of Murphy. After two hours of deliberation the jury pronounced Barrett guilty.

One of the trial lawyers, Montagu Williams, wrote:

On being asked if he had anything to say before sentence was passed, Barrett delivered an emotional speech from the dock, which ended:

The next day the Daily Telegraph reported that Barrett had:

Execution
Many people, including a number of Radical MPs, pressed for clemency. In Fermanagh, Barrett's aged mother walked several miles in the snow to appeal to the local Conservative MP, Captain Archdale, a staunch Orangeman, who rejected her.

Barrett was executed outside the walls of Newgate Prison on 26 May 1868 before a crowd of two thousand who booed, jeered and sang Rule Britannia and Champagne Charlie as his body dropped.

On 27 May, following the execution, Reynold's News commented:

Barrett's execution was the last public hanging to take place in England. The hangman was William Calcraft.

Until their transfer to the City of London Cemetery, Michael Barrett's remains lay for 35 years in a lime grave inside the walls of Newgate Prison. When the prison was demolished in 1903 his remains were taken to their present resting place. Today the grave is a place of Fenian pilgrimage and is marked by a small plaque.

Aftermath of the explosion
After the explosion the Prime Minister Benjamin Disraeli advocated the suspension of the Habeas Corpus Act in Great Britain, as was already the case in Ireland. Greater security measures were quickly introduced. Thousands of special constables were enrolled to aid the police and at Scotland Yard a special secret service department was established to meet the Fenian threat. Although a number of people were arrested and brought to trial, Michael Barrett was the only one to receive the death sentence. 

Within days of the explosion, the Liberal leader, William Ewart Gladstone, then in opposition, announced his concern about Irish Nationalist grievances and said that it was the duty of the British people to remove them. Later, he said that it was the Fenian action at Clerkenwell that turned his mind towards Home Rule. 
When Gladstone discovered at Hawarden later that year that Queen Victoria had invited him to form a government he famously stated, "my mission is to pacify Ireland".

References

Further reading
McConville, Seán. Irish Political Prisoners, 1848–1922: Theatres of War. London: Routledge (UK), 2003. 
Quinlivan P, Rose P. Fenians in England, 1865–72 Calder Publications Ltd, 1983.
Ranelagh, John O'Beirne. A Short History of Ireland. Cambridge: Cambridge University Press, 1994. 
Richter, Donald C. Riotous Victorians. Athens: Ohio University Press, 1981. 
Roby, Kinley E. The King, the Press and the People: A Study of Edward VII. London: Barrie & Jenkins, 1975. 
Swift, Roger. Irish Migrants in Britain, 1815–1914: A Documentary History. Cork: Cork University Press, 2002. 

1841 births
1868 deaths
1867 murders in the United Kingdom
Irish people executed abroad
Members of the Irish Republican Brotherhood
People from County Fermanagh
19th-century executions by the United Kingdom
Irish people convicted of murder
People executed by the United Kingdom by hanging
Irish mass murderers
Executed Irish people